Mohamed Ag Erlaf (born 12 July 1956) is a Malian politician.

On 6 August 2018, 18 of the 24 candidates in Mali's presidential election demanded Erlaf's resignation as Minister of Territorial Administration and Decentralisation, blaming him for electoral fraud, which they described as "electoral robbery".

References

Living people
Government ministers of Mali
Place of birth missing (living people)
21st-century Malian people
1956 births